Listed below is the league history of Holywell Town (and the previous Holywell teams) in all the leagues that they have played in from the start of league football being played in Holywell starting in 1893 to the present day.
Any season that is not mention within the list is where the league data cannot be found at this current time.

1893–1910 (As Holywell F.C.)

North Wales Coast League 1893–1898
Holywell F.C. was one of the seven founders of the North Wales Coast League and played in the league from its inception until 1898.

West Cheshire League 1898–1899
Holywell F.C. would play only one season in the West Cheshire League, where other Flintshire teams were applying their trade, before returning to the North Wales Coast League the following season.

North Wales Coast League 1899–1901
Holywell F.C. returned to the North Wales Coast League after a season's hiatus and played in the league for the two seasons over the turn of the century.

1910–1930 (As Holywell United)

North Wales Coast League 1912–26
Holywell United played in the Coast League pre and post World War I.

1930–1939 (As Holywell Arcadians)

Welsh Football League 1930–33
Holywell Arcadians played in the Welsh Football League for three seasons from 1930 to 1933.

1945–1970

West Cheshire League 1947–49

After the Second World War, Holywell Town would play two seasons in the West Cheshire League alongside fellow Flintshire side and rival Flint Town United before moving back to the Welsh leagues.

Welsh League (North) 1949–66
Holywell Town played in the Welsh League (North), which would later become the foundation for the Welsh Alliance League, from 1949 to 1966.

1970–1990

Welsh National League (Wrexham Area) 1970–1973
At the start of the 1970s, Holywell Town would play in the Welsh National League (Wrexham Area) for three seasons, getting promoted on two consecutive seasons and reaching Division 2 in the Welsh National League structure.

Clwyd League System 1975–1988
Holywell played in the Clwyd League system from 1975 to 1988.

Welsh Alliance League 1988–90

1990–2015

Cymru Alliance 1990–92
Holywell became founding members of the new North Wales league, Cymru Alliance, and would stay in the league for the first two seasons, until they moved to the newly created national top tier League of Wales in 1992.

League of Wales 1992–97
Holywell became founding members of the new top-tier league of the Welsh football league system.
They would stay in the League of Wales for five seasons until getting relegated in 1997.

Cymru Alliance 1997–98
Holywell dropped into the second tier of the Welsh football league system, and the first time in the Cymru Alliance since the 1991–92 season.
They would stay for only one season, getting promoted back to the League of Wales as runners-up instead of league winners Rhydymwyn.

League of Wales 1998–99
Holywell stayed in the top-flight of the Welsh football league system for just one season before getting relegated once again to the Cymru Alliance.
Currently, this is the last season Holywell were playing top-flight football in Wales.

Cymru Alliance 1999–2006
Holywell returned into the second tier of the Welsh football league system, after just one season in the League of Wales.
They would stay in the Cymru Alliance for seven seasons until they were relegated in 2006.

Welsh Alliance League 2006–2015
Holywell dropped into the third tier of the Welsh football league system, and the first time in the Welsh Alliance League since the 1989–90 season.
In the 2010–11 season, the Welsh Alliance split into two divisions due to the reorganisation of the Welsh football league system. They would spend nine seasons in the Welsh third tier before getting promoted in the 2014–15 season.

2015 – Present

Cymru Alliance 2015–2019

After nine seasons away, Holywell Town returned to the second tier for the start of the 2015–16 season. After finishing in fifth position for three consecutive seasons, they were eventually relegated back to the third tier on the final day of the 2018–19 season after finishing fourteenth in the sixteen team league. The Wellmen competed in the Cymru Alliance for four seasons before going into the Welsh National League (Wrexham Area) Premier Division.

Welsh National League (Wrexham Area) 2019–2020

The 2019–20 season saw Holywell Town compete in the Welsh National League (Wrexham Area) football system for the first time after being relegated from the second tier at the end of the 2018–19 season. Due to their location within north-east Wales, the Flintshire-based side was placed in the WNL pyramid, whose governance area covers clubs from Flintshire, Wrexham and eastern Denbighshire.

In the middle of the 2019–20 season, the Football Association of Wales Board decided that all leagues between tier 1 - 4 would be curtailed due to the COVID-19 pandemic. Promotion and relegation was decided on an unweighted points per game basis. This resulted in Holywell Town winning the league with 2.47 points per game.

Cymru North 2020- 
Holywell Town returned back to the second tier of the Welsh football pyramid after a season's hiatus, playing in the Cymru North, the replacement for the Cymru Alliance following the reorganisation of the tier two leagues in the 2019-20 season. The Wellmen were scheduled to compete in the 2020-21 season, but due to the COVID-19 pandemic, all football below the Cymru Premier level was voided for the season. Therefore, Holywell's first season playing in the Cymru North was the 2021-22 season when football resumed in the Welsh football pyramid.

Current league position as of 30 August 2022

References

Holywell Town